Irwin G. Priest (born 27 January 1886) received his bachelor's degree in 1907 from the University of Ohio.  He went to work for the Bureau of Standards straight from college and after just 6 years was promoted to Chief of Colorimetry Section of the Optics division.  He was named the first honorary lifetime member of the American Oil Chemists' Society in 1913 for his work on oil color grading.  He was elected president of the Optical Society of America and served from 1928 to 1929.

See also
Optical Society of America#Past Presidents of the OSA

References

External links
 Articles Published by early OSA Presidents  Journal of the Optical Society of America

American physicists
Presidents of Optica (society)
Year of death missing
1886 births